NFFA may refer to:

 Nuclear-Free Future Award, an award given for anti-nuclear activism
 The New Founding Fathers of America, a fictional political party that is a central element in the dystopian franchise The Purge
 Nigerian Filipino Families Association, an organization in Nigeria for ethnic-Philippine Afro-Asians
 Ba Airport, Ba, Viti Levu, Fiji (IATA airport code: NFFA; ICAO airport code: BFJ), see List of airports in Fiji

See also

 NFA (disambiguation)